Ali Doro is the smallest town in North Shewa Zone, in the Oromia Region of Ethiopia. The town is located on the main street from Addis Ababa to Gojjam between Gerba Guracha and Degem.

Populated places in the Oromia Region